The 1979–80 Coppa Italia, the 33rd Coppa Italia was an Italian Football Federation domestic cup competition won by Roma.

Group stage

Group 1

Group 2

Group 3

Group 4

Group 5

Group 6

Group 7

Quarter-finals 
Join the defending champion: Juventus.

p=after penalty shoot-out

Semi-finals 

p=after penalty shoot-out

Final

Top goalscorers

References
rsssf.com
 Official site
 Bracket

Coppa Italia seasons
Coppa Italia
Coppa Italia